No Mercy for the Rude is a 2006 South Korean neo-noir action comedy film directed by Park Chul-hee. It stars Shin Ha-kyun in the lead role. The film revolves around a mute hitman who vows to kill only rude people, and use the money for his tongue operation.

The film released theatrically in South Korea on 24 August 2006.

Plot 
A lonely chef with a speech impediment takes a job as a professional killer in order to raise the money he needs for an operation on his tongue. Known as "Killar" (Shin Ha-kyun), he and his partner "Ballet" (Kim Min-jun), make a rule to only kill rude and impolite people. After killing each one of his victims, "Killar" goes to the same bar where he meets "Her" (Yoon Ji-hye), a woman who becomes attracted to him. His life begins to unravel after he and "Ballet" kill the wrong person by mistake.

Cast 
 Shin Ha-kyun ... "Killar"
 Yeo Jin-goo ..."young killar"
 Yoon Ji-hye ... "Her"
 Kim Min-jun ... "Ballet"
 Kang San ... "Young Boy"
 Park Gil-soo ... "Feces Weight"
 Park Choong-seon ... "Detective Seo"
 Seon Woo ... "Knife Scar"
 Kim Byeong-ok ... "Hairtail"
 Lee Han-wi ... "Chief Killa"
 Kim Eung-soo ... "Director"
 Ko Chang-seok ... "Piano"

Release 
No Mercy for the Rude was released in South Korea on 24 August 2006, and on its opening weekend was ranked second at the box office with 269,308 admissions.

References

External links 
 
 
 

2006 films
2000s Korean-language films
2006 action comedy films
2000s crime action films
South Korean action comedy films
South Korean crime action films
South Korean neo-noir films
Films about contract killing
2000s South Korean films